Elia Legati (born 3 January 1986) is an Italian professional footballer who plays as a defender for FeralpiSalò.

Club career
Legati was signed by Milan from Fiorenzuola in 2001. He played in their youth teams for six years, before joining Legnano on a two-season loan in August 2006.

For the 2008–09 season he moved to French side Monaco on another loan spell; however, he was called back in January, due to lack of playing time, and subsequently loaned to Novara for the remainder of the season.

In July 2009, he was transferred to Crotone in a co-ownership deal, for €10,000. He made 40 appearances and scored one goal in his first Serie B season; his good performances prompted Milan to re-acquire him fully, for €350,000. However, for the 2010–11 season, he was signed by Padova in a new co-ownership deal, for €660,000. In June 2011 Padova bought him outright for another €660,000.

On 16 January 2018, he signed a contract with FeralpiSalò until 30 June 2020.

References

External links 
 Profile at Assocalciatori.it 
 Profile at EmozioneCalcio.it 
 International Caps at FIGC.it 
 
 

1986 births
Living people
People from Fidenza
Footballers from Emilia-Romagna
Italian footballers
Association football defenders
Serie B players
Serie C players
A.C. Milan players
A.C. Legnano players
Novara F.C. players
F.C. Crotone players
Calcio Padova players
A.C. Carpi players
Venezia F.C. players
F.C. Pro Vercelli 1892 players
FeralpiSalò players
AS Monaco FC players
Italian expatriate footballers
Italian expatriate sportspeople in Monaco
Expatriate footballers in Monaco
Italy youth international footballers
Sportspeople from the Province of Parma